I'll Fly Away is an American television drama series that aired on NBC from October 7, 1991, to February 5, 1993. Set during the late 1950s and early 1960s, in an unspecified Southern U.S. state, it starred Regina Taylor as Lilly Harper, a Black housekeeper for the family of district attorney Forrest Bedford, played by Sam Waterston (the character's name is a twist on the name of Confederate Army General Nathan Bedford Forrest, an early leader of the Ku Klux Klan). As the show progresses, Lilly becomes increasingly involved in the Civil Rights Movement, which eventually pulls in her employer, as well.

Overview
I'll Fly Away won two 1992 Emmy Awards (Eric Laneuville for Outstanding Individual Achievement in Directing in a Drama Series for the episode "All God's Children", and for series creators Joshua Brand and John Falsey for Outstanding Individual Achievement in Writing in a Miniseries or a Special), and 23 nominations in total. It won three Humanitas Prizes, two Golden Globe Awards, two NAACP Image Awards for Outstanding Drama Series, and a Peabody Award.  However, the series was never a ratings blockbuster, and it was cancelled by NBC in 1993, despite widespread protests by critics and viewer organizations.

After the program's cancellation, a two-hour film, I'll Fly Away: Then and Now, was produced, to resolve dangling storylines from season two, and provide the series with a true finale. The movie aired on October 11, 1993, on PBS. Its major storyline closely paralleled the true story of the 1955 murder of Emmett Till in Money, Mississippi. Thereafter, PBS began airing repeats of the original episodes, ceasing after one complete showing of the entire series. The series also aired on PAX.

The series takes its name from a Christian hymn written in 1929 by Albert E. Brumley.

In 1999, TV Guide ranked Lilly Harper number 15 on its list of 50 Greatest TV Characters of All Time. In 2013 it ranked the series #9 on their list of 60 shows that were "Cancelled Too Soon".

Cast

Regular cast

Recurring cast

Mary Alice as Marguerite Peck
Wayne Brady as Damon Rollins
Roger Aaron Brown as Reverend Henry
Cara Buono as Diane Lowe
Vondie Curtis-Hall as Joe Clay and Howard Yearwood
Michael Dolan as Francis Vawter
Ed Grady as Judge Lake Stevens
Dorian Harewood as Clarence "Cool Papa" Charleston
Deborah Hedwall as Gwen Bedford
Tommy Hollis as Oscar Wilson
Rebecca Koon as Eileen Slocum
Elizabeth Omilami as Joelyn
Scott Paulin as Tucker Anderson
Harold Perrineau as Robert Evans
Amy Ryan as Parky Sasser
Sonny Shroyer as Bobby Slocum
N'Bushe Wright as Claudia Bishop

Setting
The series takes place in the fictional town of Bryland, in fictional Bryland County.

The state in which Bryland is located is never specified. At various points, the District of Columbia and these Southern states were mentioned in ways that eliminate them as possible settings: Alabama, Arkansas, Florida, Maryland, Mississippi, North Carolina, Tennessee, Texas, and Virginia. Mentions of "counties" in the state eliminate Louisiana, which instead has parishes.

In "Freedom Bus", Forrest Bedford is described as a new U.S. Attorney "in the Fifth District", presumably a reference to the Fifth Judicial Circuit of the federal court system.  In the late 1950s and early 1960s, the Fifth Circuit comprised Alabama, Florida, Louisiana, Mississippi, Texas, Georgia, and the Panama Canal Zone. Because the first five states listed can be eliminated on the basis of statements made by characters throughout the series, the likeliest setting for the series is Georgia.

Episodes

Season 1 (1991–1992)

Season 2 (1992–1993)

TV film

Awards and nominations

See also
 Any Day Now
 Civil rights movement in popular culture

References

External links
 
 

1990s American drama television series
1991 American television series debuts
1993 American television series endings
English-language television shows
NBC original programming
PBS original programming
Peabody Award-winning television programs
Primetime Emmy Award-winning television series
Television series by Lorimar Television
Television series set in the 1950s
Television series set in the 1960s
Television shows set in Atlanta
Civil rights movement in television
Television series created by Joshua Brand
Television series created by John Falsey
Television series about prosecutors